Louis Jean-Pierre Cabri (born February 23, 1934 in Cairo) is an eminent  Canadian scientist in the field of platinum group elements (PGE) mineralogy with expertise in precious metal mineralogy and base metals at the Canada Centre for Mineral and Energy Technology (CANMET).  First as Research Scientist and later as Principal Scientist (1996–1999). In the 1970s he discovered two new Cu–Fe sulfide minerals, "mooihoekite" and "haycockite". In 1983 Russian mineralogists named a new mineral after him: cabriite (Pd2SnCu).

Family

Louis was born in Cairo as son of Ludovicus Petrus Maria Cabri (born in Antwerp, Belgium)  and Cézarinne-Marie Kahil (born in Alexandria, Egypt).  His family is of Dutch Huguenot descent (from 's-Hertogenbosch, The Netherlands) with its origins in Saint-Jean-du-Gard, France.  He is married to Canada's well-known ceramic artist Mimi Mignon De Meillon.  His son Louis Andrew De Meillon Cabri is a Canadian writer and poet (New Creative Writing). His daughter Annemarie was a dancer with "Het Nationale Ballet" in Amsterdam, directed Cabri Creative Dance school in Victoria, British Columbia and is now a dance educator and performer in Toronto, Ontario, Canada.  Annemarie teaches for "YOUdance"
the outreach program of The National Ballet Company (Canada); in Victoria (BC) she directs and teaches summer programs for this ballet company ". Claudia, their youngest child is a modern art painter living and working in her restaurant in Paris.

Education

1954 : B.Sc. (Geology and Chemistry) — University of the Witwatersrand
1955 : B.Sc. (Geology — Honours) — University of the Witwatersrand
1961 : M.Sc. (Appld) — McGill University
1965 : Ph.D. — McGill University

Scientific Achievements

According to The Royal Society of Canada,  Louis J. Cabri "...attained international eminence for his work on sulphides and tellurides, on the platinum-groupminerals, and ... for pioneering mineralogical applications of micro-beam trace-element analytical techniques such as micro-Proton-induced X-ray emission (PIXE) and Secondary-Ion Mass Spectrometry (SIMS). His fundamental work on the platinum-group minerals has brought order and understanding to a previously chaotic field of knowledge. All his work is characterized by innovative experimental approaches that have greatly advanced our knowledge and understanding of the behaviour of precious metals in Earth systems and mineral process products. ...." .

He started his scientific career with many field explorations in Africa (Ghana, Sierra Leone, Zimbabwe and South Africa). Later, he pursued phase-stability and crystal-chemistry relationships in the [Cu–Fe–S] (Copper-Iron-Sulfide) System, which led to his discovery in 1972 of two new Cu–Fe sulfide minerals, "Mooihoekite" ( Cu9Fe9S16) and "Haycockite" (Cu4Fe5S8). He went on researching platinum group minerals, and characterised this group and their crystal chemistry, nomenclature, geochemistry and geological occurrence. He has studied many of the world's PGM deposits, both primary and placer, for example Sudbury (Ontario), Tulameen River (British Columbia), Stillwater Complex (Montana), Itabira (Brazil), Norilsk–Talnakh (Russia), Kondyor Massif (Russia), Great Dyke (Zimbabwe), Freetown Complex (Sierra Leone), and Onverwacht, the Witwatersrand Reef and the Merensky Reef of the Bushveld Complex (South Africa).

In 1983, Russian mineralogists named a new mineral after him : Cabriite (Pd2SnCu).

He was chairman and  president for a number of national and international geological and mineralogical associations and has chaired and co-chaired numerous technical meetings, nationally and internationally. He serves as a consultant to industry, government organizations and universities in Canada and abroad, independently since 1999, incorporated in 2004 and a principal of CNT-Mineral Consulting Inc. since 2005.

Professional awards
Selwyn Blaylock Medal, Canadian Institute of Mining & Metallurgy (2004)
P.Geo. - Association of Professional Geoscientists of Ontario (2002)
Fellow, Royal Society of Canada (2001)
Leonard G. Berry Medal, Mineralogical Association of Canada (1993); 
 Waldemar Lindgren Award for Excellence in Research by the Society of Economic Geologists in 1965 for his article "Phase relations in the Au-Ag-Te system and their mineralogical significance." published in 1965 in Economic Geology, 60, 1569-1606.

Publications

Books

2002 The Geology, Geochemistry, Mineralogy, and Mineral Beneficiation of the Platinum-Group Elements. Edited by L.J. Cabri. Canadian Institute of Mining, Metallurgy and Petroleum, Special Volume 54, 852 pages.
1999 Analytical Technology in the Mineral Industries, Proceedings 128th TMS Annual Meeting & Exhibition, Eds.: L.J. Cabri, C.H. Bucknam, E.B. Milosavljevic, S.L. Chryssoulis and R. A. Miller (Warrendale, PA: The Minerals, Metals, and Materials Society, 1999), 281 pages.
1998 Advanced Methods in Ore and Environmental Mineralogy, Eds. L.J. Cabri & D.J. Vaughan, Mineralogical Association of Canada, Short Course Volume 27, 434 pages.
1981 Platinum-Group elements: Mineralogy, Geology, Recovery, Editor and principal contributor, CIM Special Volume 23, 267 pages.  2nd edition reprinted 1989.

Articles

Louis Cabri has published over 200 articles about mineralogy, including:

 McDonald, A.M., Proenza, J.A., Zaccarini, F., Rudashevsky, N.S., Cabri, L.J., Stanley, C.J., Rudashevsky, V.N., Melgarejo, J.C., Lewis, J.F., Longo, F. and Bakker, R.J. (2010). Garutiite, (Ni,Fe,Ir), a new hexagonal polymorph of native Ni from Loma Peguera, Dominican Republic. European Journal of Mineralogy, 22, 293-304.
 Cabri, L.J., Choi, Y., Nelson, M., Tubrett, M., & Sylvester, P.J. (2010) Advances in Precious Metal Trace Element Analyses for Deportment using LAM-ICPMS, in Proceedings of 42nd Annual meeting of The Canadian Mineral Processors, 181-196.
 Cabri, L.J., Martin, C.J., & Nelson, M. (2009) Deportment methodology for low-grade Ni-Cu-PGE ores. Proceedings of 48th Conference of Metallurgists, (eds. C. Hamilton, B. Hart & P.J. Whittaker), 3-15.
 Zaccarini, F., Proenza, J.A., Rudashevsky, N.S., Cabri, L.J., Garuti, G., Rudashevsky, V.N., Melgarejo, J.C., Lewis, J.F., Longo, F., Bakker, R.J., and Stanley, C.J. (2009) The Loma Peguera ophiolitic chromitite (Central Dominican Republic): a source of new platinum group mineral (PGM) species. N. Jb. Miner. Abh., 185/3, 335-349.
 Thorne, K.G., Lentz, D.R., Hoy, D., Fyffe, L.R., and Cabri, L.J. (2008) Characteristics of Mineralization at the Main Zone of the Clarence Stream Gold Deposit, Southwestern New Brunswick, Canada: Evidence for an Intrusion-Related Gold System in the Northern Appalachian Orogen. Exploration and Mining Geology, Vol. 17, Nos. 1–2, p. 13–49.
 Oberthür, T., Melcher, F., Sitnikova, M., Rudashevsky, N.S., Rudashevsky, V.N., Cabri, L.J., Lodziak, J. Klosa, D. and Gast, L. (2008) Combination of Novel Mineralogical Methods in the Study of Noble Metal Ores – Focus on Pristine (Bushveld, Great Dyke) and Placer Platinum Mineralisation. Ninth International Congress for Applied Mineralogy ICAM 2008. The Australasian Institute of Mining and Metallurgy, Publication Series No 8/2008, 187-194.
 K Kojonen, K., Cabri, L.J., McMahon, G., Johanson, B., Leppinen, J. and Kalapudas, R. (2008) Applied Mineralogy of the Suurikuusikko Refractory Gold Deposit, Northern Finland. Ninth International Congress for Applied Mineralogy ICAM 2008. The Australasian Institute of Mining and Metallurgy, Publication Series No 8/2008, 277-284.
 Cabri, L.J., Y. Choi, C. H. Hamilton, P. Kondos, and R. Lastra (2008) Hydroseparation concentrates and automated precious metal searches used to characterise process products from selected mines. Ninth International Congress for Applied Mineralogy ICAM 2008. The Australasian Institute of Mining and Metallurgy, Publication Series No 8/2008, 261-264.
 Cabri, L.J., Rudashevsky, N.S., Rudashevsky, V.N. (2008) Current approaches for the process mineralogy of platinum-group element ores and tailings. Ninth International Congress for Applied Mineralogy ICAM 2008. The Australasian Institute of Mining and Metallurgy, Publication Series No 8/2008, 9-17.
 McDonald, A.M., Cabri, L.J., Rudashevsky, N.S., Stanley, C.J., Rudashevsky, V.N. and Ross, K.C. (2008) Nielsenite, PdCu3, a new platinum-group intermetallic mineral from the Skaergaard Intrusion, Greenland. Canadian Mineralogist, 46, 709-716.

References

External links
  CNT Mineral Consulting
 Mineralogical Society of America
   The Canadian Institute of Mining, Metallurgy and Petroleum
  The Mineralogical Association of Canada Executive Committees and Councillors 1956-2005

1934 births
20th-century Canadian geologists
Canadian mineralogists
Living people
Canadian metallurgists
University of the Witwatersrand alumni
McGill University Faculty of Science alumni
21st-century Canadian geologists